Well Well Well is the debut album by the Sheffield band Milburn. The album was released on 9 October 2006 in the UK on Mercury Records. It was leaked onto the internet about a month before release. A limited edition first pressing includes numbered slipcase and four extra tracks.

Track listing

"Let Me Go" – 3:01 (Bonus track)
"December" – 2:54 (Bonus track)
"17" – 3:00 (Bonus track)
"Brewster" (Featuring Billy Bragg) – 3:50 (Bonus track)

Charts

References

2006 debut albums
Milburn (band) albums
Mercury Records albums
Albums produced by Dave Eringa